Tom is an American sitcom television series which premiered on CBS during the mid-season from March 2 to June 13, 1994. It was canceled after one season due to poor ratings.

Cast
Tom Arnold as Tom Graham
Alison LaPlaca as Dorothy Graham
Jason Marsden as Mike Graham
Andrew Lawrence as Donnie Graham
Josh Stoppelwerth as Trevor Graham
Danton Stone as Rodney
Colleen Camp as Kara
Kathryn Lubran as Charlotte Graham
Tiffany Lubran as Emily Graham

Episodes

External links
 

1994 American television series debuts
1994 American television series endings
1990s American sitcoms
CBS original programming
English-language television shows
Television shows set in Kansas
Television series by Warner Bros. Television Studios